St. Stephen's College is a constituent college of the University of Delhi, widely regarded as one of the oldest and most prestigious colleges for arts and sciences in India. It was established in 1881 by the Cambridge Mission to Delhi. The college admits both undergraduates and postgraduates and awards degrees in liberal arts and sciences under the purview of the University of Delhi. 

In 2017, the governing body of the college unilaterally initiated a move toward making it an autonomous institution. In 2018, the plan was put on hold after the University Grants Commission received legal advice against passing a favourable decision.

Ranked eleventh among colleges in India by the National Institutional Ranking Framework (NIRF) in 2022, the institution has produced distinguished alumni in fields like politics, law, journalism, film and business.. St. Stephen's College secured the second place on India Today's 2022 Best Art colleges.

History 
The history of St. Stephen's College can be traced to St. Stephen's High School, founded in 1854 by Samuel Scott Allnutt, chaplain of Delhi, run by the Delhi Mission of the United Society. With the closure of Government College, Delhi, in 1879 because of financial problems, Valpy French immediately urged the Cambridge Mission, an Anglican mission organised by the alumni of University of Cambridge, to fill the breach. The other major aim for the foundation of the college was response to British Indian Government's policy of promoting English education in India.
It was Samuel Scott Allnutt of St. John's College, Cambridge, who was mainly responsible for founding the college. Finally on 1 February 1881, in support of the work of the United Society Partners in the Gospel, the Cambridge Brotherhood founded the St. Stephen's College. Allnutt served as its first principal.

The college's first premises were in Chandni Chowk, Delhi, with five boarders and three professors, and was an affiliate of the University of Calcutta, but later in 1882, it changed its affiliation to Punjab University. The Punjab University received its charter more than one year after the founding of St. Stephen's College, which became one of the two institutions first affiliated to it and moved into premises in Kashmiri Gate, Delhi.

In 1906, principal G. Hibbert Ware abdicated his post in favour of S. K. Rudra who became the first Indian to head a major educational institution in India. The decision was frowned upon at the time, but Rudra proved to have a tenure of extraordinary importance for the college.

Charles Freer Andrews, a prominent lecturer at the college and member of the Cambridge Brotherhood, was active in the Indian independence movement, and was named deenbandhu (friend of the poor) by Mahatma Gandhi on account of his work with the needy and the trade union movement. Currently, a portrait ofAndrews is hung beside the portrait of his good friend Rabindranath Tagore in the principal's office. It is also believed that Rabindranath Tagore completed the English translation of Gitanjali, for which he was awarded the Nobel Prize in Literature, while a guest at the college.

With the establishment of the University of Delhi in 1922, the college became a constituent college of the university.

Women were first admitted in 1928, as there were no women's colleges in Delhi affiliated with the Anglican Church at the time; after the founding of Miranda House in 1949, women were not accepted as students until 1975.

Etymology 
The college was named after Saint Stephen, who was adopted by the Anglican Church as the patron saint of Delhi after Christian converts were reportedly stoned to death during the 1857 uprising, as they were the first Christian martyrs in North India and were stoned, parallels to Saint Stephen were obvious.

Badge 
The badge is a martyr's crown on a field of martyr's red within a five-pointed star edged with Cambridge blue. The five-pointed star represents India, the Cambridge blue border of star represents the impact of University of Cambridge, having been founded by the members of the Cambridge Mission to Delhi and the ground is coloured red to represent Saint Stephen, the first Christian martyr and patron saint of the Anglican Mission in Delhi, in whose memory the college is built, stands the martyr's crown in gold.

Present form 
St. Stephen's College is a co-educational institution of higher learning. It is one of the three founding colleges of University of Delhi, along with Hindu College and Ramjas College. In spite of its location in North India, the college has always striven to admit students and select teachers from all communities and from all parts of India. It also admits a small number of students from overseas. The college offers a number of scholarships and awards to meritorious students. These are endowed over a period of time. As of February 2017, the governing body of St. Stephen's College has decided to go ahead with the proposal to seek autonomy for the institution.

Campus 

The campus is located in the North Campus of the University of Delhi and designed by the distinguished Welsh architect Walter Sykes George. The construction was completed in 1941. The college had previously functioned from a campus in Kashmiri Gate, Delhi, housed in distinctive Indo-Saracenic Revival architecture. This building now houses the Election Commission of Delhi. In fact, some college playing fields are still located between Kashmiri Gate and Mori Gate. Facilities for a number of sports are provided for on the college campus. The Francis Monk Gymnasium, the Ladies Common Room, and the Junior Common Room provide facilities for indoor sports and recreation. A chapel is open to all members for worship and meditation.

Residence halls 
The college's halls of residence are spread across six blocks, named for former principals, as given below:
Allnutt North
Allnutt South
Mukarji West
Mukarji East
Rudra North
Rudra South

These too have different parts like main block and extension. Originally only for male students (termed "Scholars in Residence"), three of these blocks are now allotted to female students. These blocks have a capacity of 500 men and women. Each block is supervised by a member of the faculty functioning as block tutor. Porters and other staff who work in residence are referred to as "gyps" and "karamcharis" respectively.

Library 
The St. Stephen's College library has rare Sanskrit and Persian manuscripts. It also offers digital services to students and has its own homegrown online public access catalog. There is also a college archive housed in the library, containing various documents relating to the history of the college.

Organisation and administration

Departments
The departments offering courses include:
Political science
Chemistry
Physics
Mathematics
Computer science
English
Economics
History
Philosophy
Sanskrit
Hindi
Urdu and Persian
Physical education

There is also an International Languages School which provides certificate courses in European and Asian languages. Further several departments have their own undergraduate research fellowships to encourage undergraduates to engage in research. These fellowships are in partnership with other colleges in some cases or advised by the faculty themselves. There are additional certificate courses offered by the college as well in addition to those provided by the Delhi University.

The curriculum of the courses followed is in tune with those of the Delhi University. Two annual exams are held and internal assessment contributing to 25% marks make up for continuous evaluation during the rest of the semester.

The college has also introduced a one of a kind certificate course in "Citizenship and Cultural Richness" which brings together a series of lectures by eminent Indian academics in a variety of fields ranging from science to literature, economics and social values. This had been touted as outreach by the principal of the college.

Academics

Rankings

St. Stephen's is ranked eighth among colleges in India by the National Institutional Ranking Framework (NIRF) in 2021. India Today ranked St. Stephen second among art colleges and third among science colleges in 2020.

Admission
The college has its own selection process unlike other colleges under Delhi University. The college has an online application process where prospective applicants are expected to fill in their interests and academic achievements. The college releases a list for students selected to an interview and admission test by the first week of June. Every department has its own academic criteria and admission test/interview process. The interview constitutes 15% of the evaluation process. Candidates called for interview are usually selected in a ratio of 5:1. St. Stephen's generally receives around 30,000 applicants for 400 seats each year leading to an incredibly low admit rate of 1.33%. However, this rate is also offset by reservation for minorities which amount to 50% and reservation for scheduled castes, tribes and as allowed by the Indian Constitution. Accounting for all quotas for affirmative action, St. Stephen's admits roughly 40% students from the general category.

The college also has several exchange programs with universities from Japan, the UK, Europe and the US.

Student life

Student societies 
Student clubs and societies have always played an important role in the life of the college, and are seen as vital to student development. Each academic subject has a society which sponsors lectures and discussions. The popular extra-curricular societies and clubs engage in activities concerned with debating, dramatics, wall climbing and trekking, film, social service, photography, quizzing and astronomy. The social service league is the largest and most active society of St. Stephen's College which follows the mantra "Service above Self". It works for the betterment of the underprivileged sections of the society. In continuance of a long tradition, the Planning Forum regularly invites distinguished visitors to address and join issue with students on various topical issues. The college also publishes department newsletters, college magazines and yearbooks. Several departments also publish their annual journals aside from the college publications. The college English dramatics society, the Shakespeare Society, is amongst the most famous clubs in the institution, with a history dating back to the turn of the 20th century. The Shakespeare Society has had a long tradition of performing at least one Shakespeare play annually, a tradition that has started to change with time.  Many celebrities started out in this society including Konkana Sen and Kabir Bedi.

Notable alumni 

Alumni and students of St. Stephen's College are called "Stephanians". The college has produced many distinguished alumni, including several members of the Indian Parliament and the presidents of three countries. The college is one of the largest contributors to Indian Rhodes Scholars, as well as Chevening, Commonwealth, Inlaks, Nehru-Fulbright scholars among others. Alumni of the college include distinguished economists, CEOs of Fortune 500 companies, scientists, mathematicians, historians, writers, bureaucrats, journalists, lawyers, and sportspersons including a number of Olympians and international athletes.

References

External links
 

Delhi University
Universities and colleges in Delhi
Universities and colleges affiliated with the Church of North India
Educational institutions established in 1881
1881 establishments in British India